Dorothea Agetle (born 6 April 1950 in Sluderno) is an Italian Paralympic cross-country skier, the first woman to win a Winter Paralympic medal for Italy. She won two silver and four bronze medals.

Career 

At the 1988 Winter Paralympics, in Innsbruck, she competed in Women's Long Distance 5 kilometers Gr II, and Women's Short Distance 2.5 kilometers Gr II.

At the 1992 Winter Paralympics, in Albertville, she won bronze medals in Women's Long Distance 5 kilometers LW10-11, and Women's Short Distance 2.5 kilometers LW10-11.

At the 1994 Winter Paralympics, she won a silver medal in Women's 10 kilometers Sitski LW10-11, and bronze medals in Women's 5 kilometers Sitski LW10-11, and Women's 2.5 kilometers Sitski LW10-11. At the 1998 Winter Paralympics, in Nagano, she won a silver medal in Women's 10 kilometers Sitski LW10-12. She competed in Women's 5 kilometers Sitski LW10-12, and Women's 2.5 kilometers Sitski LW10-12.

At the 2002 Winter Paralympics, in Salt Lake City, she competed in Women's 7.5 kilometers Sitski, Women's 5 kilometers Sitski, Women's 2.5 kilometers Sitski, and Women's 10 km Sitski.

References 

Living people
1950 births
Italian female cross-country skiers
Paralympic cross-country skiers of Italy
People from South Tyrol
Cross-country skiers at the 1988 Winter Paralympics
Cross-country skiers at the 1992 Winter Paralympics
Cross-country skiers at the 1994 Winter Paralympics
Cross-country skiers at the 2002 Winter Paralympics
Medalists at the 1992 Winter Paralympics
Medalists at the 1994 Winter Paralympics
Paralympic silver medalists for Italy
Paralympic bronze medalists for Italy